The University of Saint Joseph (USJ;) is a Catholic university founded in 1996, previously known as Macau Inter-University Institute (IIUM). It was jointly organized by the Catholic University of Portugal and the Diocese of Macau. It is also connected by structural, academic, and social bonds to the special administrative region of Macau, to Portugal, and to mainland China. It expresses its mission as being a private Catholic University in, of and for Macao, in of and for China, concentrating on post-graduate teaching and research, together with professional training in the liberal arts and social sciences.

USJ offers a wide range of courses ranging from the humanities to the social and technological sciences. New courses are regularly being added in order to keep pace with the most recent academic and scientific advances in the modern world. There are programs for certificates, diplomas, licentiate (undergraduate/bachelor's), master's and doctoral degrees, and also some interesting Language Programs which include the teaching of Putonghua (Mandarin), Portuguese, Japanese, French, and English.

History
Catholic higher education in Asia began with the founding, in 1594, of the Colégio de Macau by Fr Alessamdro Valignano SJ. Frs Michele Ruggieri, Matteo Ricci and Adam Schall von Bell SJs studied there, as did St Andrew Kim, the first Korean Martyr. Part of its teaching was transferred to the Seminário de São Jose in 1728 where the teaching of theology, philosophy and religious studies continues to this day (after a 28 year break between 1968 & 1996) as part on USJ's Faculty of Religious Studies and Philosophy.

In 1996 the formation of IIUM (renamed USJ in 2006) marked the formal resumption of a 400 year tradition.

In September 2017, the university moved its main campus building to Ilha Verde.

The university's fourth rector, the Rev'd Prof Stephen Morgan DPhil(Oxon) was elected on 9th March 2020 and installed on 23 May 2020. He is a theologian and ecclesiastical historian who had previously been the university's Dean of the Faculty of Religious Studies.

In September 2021, the University announced that it had been given permission to recruit students from Mainland China for the first time.

Campuses
The university has three campuses: The main campus in Ilha Verde, Nossa Senhora de Fátima (Our Lady of Fátima Parish); its original campus (NAPE1) in Sé (Cathedral Parish); and the Saint Joseph Seminary in São Lourenço (Saint Lawrence).

Courses offered
The University of Saint Joseph offers a board range of academic programmes at the Pre-University, Undergraduate and Post-Graduate level, as well as non-degree programs, offered through the Lifelong Learning Office.

Undergraduate Degree Programmes  

List of Bachelor Degree Programmes:
 Bachelor Programme
 Architectural Studies
 Business Administration
 Christian Studies
 Communication and Media
 Design
 Digital Cinema
 Education
 Environmental Science
 Fashion Design
 Philosophy
 Portuguese-Chinese Studies (Language and Culture)
 Portuguese-Chinese Translation Studies
 Psychology
 Social Work

List of Pre-University:
 Foundation Year in Philosophy
 Pre-University

List of Associate Diploma Programs:
 Media Production
 Portuguese-Chinese Translation
 Product Design

Graduate Degree Programmes  

List of Master Degree Programmes:
 Architecture
 Business Administration
 Communication and Media
 Community Development
 Counselling and Psychotherapy
 Design (Specialisation in Interactive Design)
 Education
 Environmental Sciences and Management
 Government Studies
 History and Heritage Studies
 Lusophone and International Public Law
 Lusophone Studies in Linguistics and Literature
 Mestrado de Estudos Lusófonos em Linguística e Literatura
 Organisational Psychology
 Philosophy
 Faculty of Religious Studies and Philosophy
 Faculty of Social Sciences and Education
 教育碩士學位課程

List of Doctoral Degree Programmes:
 Business Administration
 Education
 Global Studies
 Government Studies
 History
 Information Systems
 Psychology
 Religious Studies
 Science

List of Post-Graduate Diploma programmes:
 Diploma de Pós-Graduação em Ciências Legislativas
 Diploma de Pós-Graduação em Educação
 Post-Graduate Diploma in Education
 Post-Graduate Diploma in Legislative Sciences
 學位後教育文憑課程

See also
 List of universities and colleges in Macau

References

External links

 University of Saint Joseph - Official website

Universities in Macau
1996 establishments in Macau
Educational institutions established in 1996